Jawad Road railway station is a small railway station in Neemuch district, Madhya Pradesh. Its code is JWO. It serves Jawad city. The station consists of two platforms, which are well sheltered and facilities including water, sanitation and waiting area is also available.

Major trains 
 Udaipur City–Ratlam Express (unreserved)
 Kota–Nimach Passenger (unreserved)
 Bhilwara–Ratlam DMU
 Nimach–Udaipur Passenger (unreserved)
 Ratlam–Ajmer Express
 Haldighati Passenger
 Veer Bhumi Chittaurgarh Express

References

Railway stations in Neemuch district
Ratlam railway division